Dag Joakim Tedson Nätterqvist (born 24 October 1974) is a Swedish actor, theatre director, musical artist, singer and songwriter and acting coach.

Background 
Nätterqvist was born in Gamla Uppsala. He is the son of competitive equestrians Ted and Pia Levin Nätterqvist and grew up on Flammabyggets equestrian farm outside Laholm. Nätterqvis learned to ride at age of four and competed in show jumping as a child and teenager. He is the grandson of Swedish show jumping rider and trainer Dag Nätterqvist.

As a youth, he was more drawn to the world of sports, rather than drama, not only competing in equestrian sports, but playing ice hockey and football as well. After attending several smaller drama institutes, he graduated from the Stockholm Academy of Dramatic Arts in Stockholm in 2001. He quickly landed a three-year stint with Stockholm City Theatre, where he appeared in, among others, Hamlet and A View from the Bridge. He also had the chance to work with Lars Norén, considered by many to be Sweden's most prominent contemporary playwright, at The National Theatre Company in his play Terminal.

He landed his first leading TV role in the 2002 mini-series Stackars Tom.

Arn: Knight Templar
Nätterqvist has since then moved on to television and film. He had his big breakthrough in 2007 when he starred in the movie Arn – The Knight Templar, its sequel and the six-part television series. Nätterqvist played the leading role of crusading knight Arn Magnusson. Once the stunt team realized how well Nätterqvist could ride, he ended up performing his own horse stunts. He also benefitted from previous classes in olympic fencing for several past theatre productions, and his general interest in fencing (he was a special guest and speaker at the 2012 Swedish Competitive Fencing Convention).

Nätterqvist was trained in medieval weapons and longbow archery by Steve Ralphs, costume armourer and archery coach for Game of Thrones, Wrath of the Titans and Ridley Scott's Robin Hood.

This is the most expensive movie project in the history of Swedish film and was shot in English and Swedish, on location in Sweden, Scotland and Morocco with an international cast. The production was headed by Svensk Filmindustri in conjunction with Film i Väst, TV4 (Sweden), Telepool (Germany), Danmarks Radio (Denmark), YLE (Finland) and TV 2 (Norway).

The Arn project has been shown on television in many areas of the world. When it was shown in France on France 4, it went up against Showtime's historical drama The Tudors, on NRJ12 in the same time slot, and rated with a higher numbers of viewers.

Recent projects 
Nätterqvist has continued work with television, theatre and film. In 2011, he co-starred in the controversial Swedish film With Every Heartbeat/Kiss Me and award-winning music video director Adam Berg's film In.
Americans saw him in the 2011 season finale of USA Network's series Covert Affairs.

Since the fall of 2011 Nätterqvist has been playing fashion designer and love interest Hugo Cronstedt in TV3's popular romantic comedy-drama Elsas Värld. The show came back for a second series in 2013 and consisted of 20 episodes, lasting into the spring of 2014.

In December 2016 the Russian medieval epic Viking premiered. Nätterqvist spent most of the previous summer shooting on location in Russia. Nätterqvist has a large supporting role as a Viking chieftain and mercenary. The film has taken around $25 million at the box office in Russia and the Commonwealth of Independent States , becoming the top-grossing Russian film to be released in 2016. It was released in western Europe on Amazon Prime and Sky Digital

In July 2017 Nätterqvist again participated in the Norwegian outdoor musical Eplene i messehagen, this time in a different role than what he played in 2014.

In 2016 Nätterqvist joined the 5th season of the popular police procedural Maria Wern as Torwalds, a Stockholm police detective, and reprised this role in season 6 (2018).

During the fall of 2018, Nätterqvist was shooting the TV-pilot for Skärvor, an outlaw motorcycle club drama-thriller, from producers Susanne Hörnquist & Magnus G Bergström. He played the part of Stefan Andreason, president of Rubicon MC

In 2019 Nätterqvist joined the 4th season of popular crime drama Gåsmamman portraying the foster dad Patrik Thorin. This season had its premier on streaming service C More in November 2019, and on Kanal 7 the following year.

Nätterqvist played Little John in Robin Hood-the Musical, which premiered in October 2019 in Stockholm, followed by a Swedish tour running into 2020, visiting over 20 different cities.

In March 2022 he will be seen as Peter Rosenberg in Beck - 58 minuter, a special episode of long running Nordic Noir series Beck detailing hostage drama in real time, which takes place during 58 intense minutes in a TV morning studio.

During the fall of 2022 and till the summer of next year he will be filming the TV-series Ronia, the Robber's Daughter in Lithuania and Gothenburg, playing the highwayman Dockas, and based on the fantasy book by the Astrid Lindgren, adapted for television by Hans Rosenfeldt, the writer behind The Bridge and Marcella.

Personal life 
Nätterqvist lives in Gamla stan, the medieval section of Stockholm. He has a son with actress Cecilia Häll named Zeth, who recently provided the voice for one of the animated characters in the Swedish release of The Good Dinosaur and also acted alongside his father in the Robin Hood musical. He has a second child with Vendela Drammeh born in late 2019.

Nätterqvist is bilingual in Swedish and English (he speaks English with two different accents, standardized American English and British RP - Received Pronunciation).

Nätterqvist's favorite play is Macbeth.

Other projects

Nätterqvist was voted sexiest man in Sweden 2007 by Plaza Magazine .

Nätterqvist has been active raising money for UNICEF.

Nätterqvist is one of the founders of Actors Studio Stockholm, a two-year drama academy.

In August 2013, rapper turned celebrity fitness trainer David "D-Flex" Seisay, published his book ‘'Träna med D-flex'’. Nätterqvist contributed to the book, and is featured in text and photos displaying Seisay's fitness instructions.

In 2020 Nätterqvist modelled sunglasses from Swedish design house Akenberg.

Music 
He has a Britpop/Indie pop band named Narcissistic Street. They released the CD Soldier in Me in 2008.
The album was recorded before he made his big breakthrough as the medieval knight and had to postpone the album release due to massive Arn project. In December 2011 the band performed at the European premiere of David Fincher's The Girl with the Dragon Tattoo.

Nätterqvist sings on two songs on post-punk revivalists The Ohios album Every Sorrow Claims Happiness. One of the tracks, "Let My Legs Walk" is featured in the soundtrack to horror-comedy American Burger.

On 21 December 2017, Nätterqvist released the Christmas-themed single "Jule ljus" on iTunes and Spotify. A second song "En sequined sen" dropped in late April 2018, and more material will be released throughout 2018, with another tune dropped in late April. The new material will steer away from the Britpop/Indie pop sound of Narcissistic Street, and move into the Swedish singer-songwriter/pop rock tradition.

Unscripted television 
Nätterqvist has also worked with unscripted television. In 2010 he almost won the Swedish version of Let's Dance for Comic Relief with his interpretation of Lady Gaga's Bad Romance.

In spring 2011 he co-hosted the popular TV cooking show Klockan åtta hos stjärnorna. He has also participated in other shows such as Herr och Fru, Doobidoo and Fenomen med Uri Geller.

In late April 2020 Nätterqvist and musical artist and model/TV-personality Tilde Fröling were celebrity guest stars on season finale of the Swedish edition of Who Wants to Be a Millionaire to raise money for the Swedish Cancer Foundation.

School 
He is the co-founder of Actors Studio Stockholm, a 2-year academic program, that incorporates and the Meisner and Chekhov techniques with Swedish stage traditions. Nätterqvist has also taught drama at several other schools in Sweden, after-school drama coaching for teens, weekend workshops, and with unemployed actors via the Public Employment Service.

Renaissance Fairs and Medieval festivals
Nätterqvist is a frequent guest at Renaissance and Medieval festivals, and Viking markets through out Sweden, including Vätteryd Historical Market, Wenngarn Medieval Festival, Venngarn Castle Medieval Festival and Sala Silver Mine Festival etc. He will sign autographs, sometimes participate in a jousting tournament and dubb children as Knights. etc.

In June late 2022 he arranged his own Medieval and Viking Market at Flammabygget Equestrian Estate

Filmography

Selected stage appearances 
 A Doll's House, Stockholm Academy of Dramatic Arts
 Inatt tänder vi månen, Stockholm Academy of Dramatic Arts
 Amadeus, Stockholm City Theatre
 The Cherry Orchard, Stockholm City Theatre
 Järn (musical) Stockholm City Theatre
 Din Stund på Jorden, Stockholm City Theatre
 Hamlet, Stockholm City Theatre
 Dostoyevsky's The Idiot, Stockholm City Theatre
 Mio, My Son,, Stockholm City Theatre
 The Full Monty (musical), Stockholm City Theatre
 As You Like It, Stockholm City Theatre
 A View from the Bridge, Stockholm City Theatre
 Piaf, Stockholm City Theatre
 Amy's View, Stockholm City Theatre
 Som Glöd under Snö (musical) Gottsunda Teater
 Terminal The National Theatre Company
 North of The Border (musical) Teater De Vill
 The Taming of the Shrew, Sheakespear at Gräsgården Manor
 Ken Ludwig's Leading Ladies, Mariebergsskogen Karlstad
 Nu är det klippt!  Dröse & Norberg Theatre Company
 Snow White: The Musical  Dröse & Norberg Theatre Company
 I Ljus & Mörker (musical) Jon Anderzon/Studieförbundet Vuxenskolan Gävleborg.
 Elden  (2014 musical) Leif Stinnerbom / Bergstaden Sylvan Theater
 Eplene i messehagen (2016 musical) Paul Ottar Haga / Malm Sylvan Theater
 Elden (2017 musical) Paul Ottar Haga / Bergstaden Sylvan Theater
 Eplene i messehagen (2018 musical) Malm Sylvan Theater
 People of Hemsö (Hemsöborna) (2019 stage play) Stallebrottet på Bohus Malmön Sylvan theater
 Robin Hood: The Musical (Fall 2019-Spring 2020) Dröse & Norberg Theatre Company
Slottspel i 1600-tals miljo (2021 actor) directed by Ika Nord, Halmstad Castle Outdoor Theater
Eplene i messehagen ( 2021 Director and actor ) written by Rasmus Rohde, Bergstaden Sylvan Theater
Sensationer på slottet (2022 actor), Halmstad Castle Outdoor Theater
Eplene i messehagen ( 2022 Director and acting in the role of Walter Jønsson ) written by Rasmus Rohde, Bergstaden Sylvan Theater

Selected podcast appearances 
 Richards and Mckie Present Randompedia

References

External links 

Swedish male actors
Living people
1974 births
Swedish male film actors
Swedish male television actors
People from Uppsala